Tom Stuifbergen (born September 26, 1988) is a right-handed pitcher for L&D Amsterdam of the Honkbal Hoofdklasse. His repertoire includes a fastball that ranges from high 80s to low 90s, a changeup and a curveball. He is 6' 4" and 240 lbs. and speaks two languages: English & Dutch.

Tom is represented by CSE Sports & Entertainment. He played for Team Netherlands in the 2019 European Baseball Championship, and at the Africa/Europe 2020 Olympic Qualification tournament, in Italy in September 2019.

Professional career
Stuifbergen played for the Amsterdam Pirates in the Netherlands before signing as an undrafted free agent with the Twins on August 16, . In , he was 0-0 with a 2.19 earned run average and nine strikeouts in 12.1 innings for the Gulf Coast League Twins.

Dutch National Team
Stuifbergen made his debut for the Netherlands National Baseball Team on July 11, 2006 against Italy in the European Baseball Championship. Stuifbergen was the winning pitcher, throwing six shutout innings with three strikeouts, five hits and one base on balls. In his second start for the Netherlands national baseball team at the Haarlemse Honkbalweek (English: Haarlem Baseball Week) against Japan, he threw 4.2 innings and gave up four earned runs with one strikeout, eight hits and one walk.

In November, he played in the 2006 Intercontinental Cup where the team was runner-up to Cuba. Stuifbergen pitched 7.1 innings in 4 appearances. His record was 2-1 with three strikeouts, three walks, nine hits and three earned runs and a 3.68 ERA.

In the 2009 World Baseball Classic, he started the Netherlands' second game against the favored Dominican Republic. He pitched 4 innings, had three strikeouts, and allowed no runs. The Dutch went on to win the game, their second of the 2009 WBC, to advance to the second round.

He played for Team Netherlands in the 2019 European Baseball Championship, at the Africa/Europe 2020 Olympic Qualification tournament in Italy in September 2019, and at the 2019 WBSC Premier12.

References

External links

Minor League Baseball

1988 births
2009 World Baseball Classic players
2013 World Baseball Classic players
2015 WBSC Premier12 players
2017 World Baseball Classic players
2019 European Baseball Championship players
Beloit Snappers players
Dutch expatriate baseball players in the United States
Elizabethton Twins players
Fort Myers Miracle players
Gulf Coast Twins players
Living people
New Britain Rock Cats players
Rochester Red Wings players
Sportspeople from Breda
L&D Amsterdam Pirates players
Corendon Kinheim players